Bellen is a rural commune in the Ségou Cercle in the Ségou Region of Mali. In the 2009 census, it had a population of 6,949.

References

External links
.
.

Communes of Ségou Region